Georg Marischka (born 29 June 1922 in Vienna; died 9 August 1999 in Munich) was an Austrian actor, screen writer, director and film producer for cinema and television.

Life 

George Marischka was born into the world of film because his father was Hubert Marischka and  Ernst Marischka was his uncle.

In 1949 he worked for Gustav Ucicky as associate director.

One year later he contributed to the screen play of  Die Sünderin (The Sinner).
Eventually in 1951 he was credited as director for the first time. Afterwards he directed three films starring the Austrian star O. W. Fischer who at that time was very popular in German-speaking countries. This included 1955's Hanussen.

Due to his reputation to be an expert concerning Karl May, he got involved in Karl May movies in the 1960s. When he had written the screenplay for Legacy of the Incas he decided to direct and produce it himself. Since the film was less successful than other Karl May movies, he consequently then concentrated on his career as an actor.

Georg Marischka appeared in many films including international productions like the feature films The Odessa File and The Boys from Brazil. He appeared in Das Blaue Palais and had in particular a reoccurring role as Jutes chief "Yorath" in the British TV series Arthur of the Britons.

Selected filmography

Director
 The Merry Farmer (1951)
 To Be Without Worries (1953)
 Hanussen (1955)
 Peter Voss, Hero of the Day (1959)
 Axel Munthe, The Doctor of San Michele (1962)
 Legacy of the Incas (1965)

Screenwriter
 The Sinner (1951)
 A Summer You Will Never Forget (1959)
 The Shoot (1964)
 The Treasure of the Aztecs (1965)
 The Pyramid of the Sun God (1965)

Actor
  (1972) - Trimborn
 A Free Woman (1972) - Schmollinger
 The Odessa File (1974) - Prosecution Attorney
 Wanted: Babysitter (1975) - Henderson
 Sept morts sur ordonnance (1975) - Paul Brézé
 King Arthur, the Young Warlord (1975) - Yorath, Chief of the Jutes
 Le bon et les méchants (1976) - Le chef de la gestapo
  (1976) - Fanzelau
 The Boys from Brazil (1978) - Gunther
  (1979, TV Movie) - Public Prosecutor General Wolfgang Trogan
  (1982) - Gross
 Am Ufer der Dämmerung (1983) - Herr Baumann
 Die unglaublichen Abenteuer des Guru Jakob (1983)
  (1984) - Reporter
 The Devil's Lieutenant (1984) - Weinberger
  (1984) - Newspaper Editor
 Das Wunder (1985) - TV Priest
  (1988) - Dr. Kneitz
 The Rose Garden (1989) - Brinkmann
 Scream of Stone (1991) - Werbeagent
 Schtonk! (1992) - Von Klantz
  (1993) - Judge
 Grüß Gott, Genosse (1993) - Ludwig Kattner

Further reading 
 Franz Zwetschi Marischka: Immer nur lächeln. Geschichten und Anekdoten von Theater und Film. Wien: Amalthea, 2001; .

External links
 

1922 births
1999 deaths
20th-century Austrian male actors
Austrian male film actors
Austrian male television actors
Austrian film directors
Austrian television directors
German-language film directors
20th-century Austrian screenwriters
20th-century Austrian male writers